The 2017–18 season was Benevento Calcio's first-ever season in Serie A, the top-flight of Italian football. The club competed in both Serie A and the Coppa Italia.

Following fourteen consecutive defeats to begin the season (an Italian top-flight record), Benevento remained rooted firmly in 20th place during the entirety of the 2017–18 campaign. The club were also eliminated early on in the third round of the Coppa Italia, falling 4–0 to Serie B side Perugia, with Juventus loanee and Italian youth player Alberto Cerri scoring a hat-trick.

Malian footballer and former Bordeaux player Cheick Diabaté, a winter signing, finished as the club's top scorer with eight goals, following an excellent end of season, though this would not be enough to save the club from returning immediately to the second division.

Players

Squad information

Transfers

In

Loans in

Out

Loans out

Competitions

Serie A

League table

Results summary

Results by round

Matches

Coppa Italia

Statistics

Appearances and goals

|-
! colspan=14 style=background:#DCDCDC; text-align:center| Goalkeepers

|-
! colspan=14 style=background:#DCDCDC; text-align:center| Defenders

|-
! colspan=14 style=background:#DCDCDC; text-align:center| Midfielders

|-
! colspan=14 style=background:#DCDCDC; text-align:center| Forwards

|-
! colspan=14 style=background:#DCDCDC; text-align:center| Players transferred out during the season

Goalscorers

Last updated: 20 May 2018

Clean sheets

Last updated: 20 May 2018

Disciplinary record

Last updated: 20 May 2018

References

Benevento Calcio seasons
Benevento